Jimmy Bowien (born 5 February 1933 in Prussia) is a record producer, songwriter and composer. He started playing the piano at the age of 5 and studied classical music to become a professional opera singer (Baritone). After graduating in Hamburg-Germany he worked with the record label Polydor writing advertising copies and created a repertoire of musical compositions. In 1959, Bowien started to discover new talents and produced records for Polydor with such artists as The Monks and Tony Sheridan, who was playing with The Beatles (aka The Beat Brothers).

Bowien is a multi-recipient of gold and platinum records and is best known for discovering new artists, composing music and producing records for Olivia Newton-John, Daliah Lavi, The Monks and Georges Moustaki. He produced such Musicals as Cats, Phantom of the Opera, Les Miserable, A Chorus Line and Mozart.

See also
Jimmy Bowien is likely to be the first record producer to take interest in The Beatles.

The Monks: The transatlantic Feedback.

Black Monk Time – Producer Jimmy Bowien.

The Monks entered the studio with a young producer named Jimmy Bowien.

Musical: Cats (Best Of Musical 2004).

Musical: Andrew Lloyd Webber – The Phantom of the Opera (German Language Version).

Musicals
 Cats (musical) (1984 Vienna)
 The Phantom of the Opera (1986 musical) (Vienna)
 Les Misérables (musical) (Vienna)
 Elisabeth (Vienna)
 Mozart( Vienna)
 La Cage aux Folles (Berlin, with Helmut Baumann)
 Little Shop Of Horrors (Berlin)
 Linie 1 – (Berlin)
 Marlene – (Berlin)
 Käpt'n Bay-Bay – (Hamburg)

Producer of Artists

 Tony Sheridan
 The Monks
 Olivia Newton-John
 Franz Josef Degenhardt 
 Daliah Lavi
 Horst Jankowski Chor
   Horst Wende Orchestra        
 Ilja Richter
 Roberto Delgado
   Antonia Maas 
 Margot Hielscher       
 Swetlana
 Conchita Bautista
 Reinhard Mey
   Eva-Maria Ihloff
   Die Tramps
   Nicos Apostolidis
 Knut Kiesewetter
 George Mavros
   Die drei Kiesewetters
 Albatros

  Eve Morris
  Terry Jacks
  Peter Stainbank                                                    
  Tina /Irland
  Helmuth Zacharias  Adolf Scherbaum                        
  Tony Maier  Peter Igelhoff  Thaddaeus Troll                   
  Milan, Paul und Ela
  Rolf Kühn
  Max Greger 
  Betty Jurkowicz
  Aase Kleveland
  Gene Pitney
  Igal Bashan
  David Rose
  Boaz Sharabi
  Wolfram Ilanit
  Peter Roland und Schobert Schulz                               
  Melina Mercouri

  Hai und Topsy
  Shirley und Colin
  Barry Ryan und Paul Ryan
  Ralf Schwendter
  Peter Horton
  Ladi Geisler
  Margot Werner
  die Scandias
  Cambridge Buskers
  Die Tonics
  Keith Barry
  Countdown
  Max Greger Jr.
  Les Copains
  Élizabeth Teissier
  Candy Floss
  Horea Crishan
  Evans-Sisters
  Katja Schimmelpfennig
  Kajetan
  The Big Six

  Holger Biege
  Gilian Scalici
  Peter Sauer
  Angelika Milster
  The Shamrocks
  Steve Barton
  Die Yankees
  Gabriele Sutter
  Spiritual-Chor Hamburg
  Freddy Quinn
  Old Merrytale Jazzband
  Günter Strack
  Linda Laine and the Sinners
  Karel Gott
  Los Amigos del Amambay
  Heidi Brühl
  Britta Martell
  Milva
  Tatjana Seyffert
  Nils Tuxen
  Die Tanztempel Ritter
  Uwe Kroeger

References

External links
Jimmy Bowien Discography at Discogs
Jimmy Bowien (aka Kim Philipp) (1965 to 1972) at Discogs

German record producers
German operatic baritones
1933 births
Living people